Lensk (Lienskey) is a town and the administrative center of Lensky District of the Sakha Republic, Russia. As of the 2010 Census, its population was 24,966.

Geography

History
The original settlement was founded as Mukhtuya in 1663 by Russian fur traders, on the site of an older Evenk settlement known as Mukhtuy. The name of the original settlement was derived from an Evenk term meaning "great water".

During the 19th and early 20th centuries, it was a place of political exile. It experienced a period of rapid growth during the 20th century as a result of the discovery and development of diamond deposits in the Vilyuy River basin. As the closest significant settlement to the major kimberlite excavations at the Mir Mine and the establishment of the associated town of Mirny, Mukhtuya became a major base of construction. In 1956, roads were built connecting Mukhtuya to the future Mirny and the port was established. On July 13, 1963, Mukhtuya was granted town status and was given its present name, after the river on which it stands.

In May 2001, Lensk briefly came to the world's attention when almost the entire town was flooded and a large amount of the buildings destroyed. The floods were caused by river ice blocking the river downstream, creating a dam. The town was largely rebuilt after the flooding.

Administrative and municipal status
Within the framework of administrative divisions, Lensk serves as the administrative center of Lensky District. As an inhabited locality, Lensk is classified as a town under district jurisdiction. As an administrative division, it is incorporated within Lensky District as the Town of Lensk. As a municipal division, the Town of Lensk is incorporated within Lensky Municipal District as Lensk Urban Settlement.

Economy
In addition to its association with the diamond industry and construction, Lensk has a significant forestry and timber sector and a large-panel housing factory. The town is also home to the Yakutalmaz scientific research organization.

Lensk is connected with Mirny by road and has scheduled air connections with Mirny, Yakutsk, and Irkutsk from the Lensk Airport. As a major port on the Lena, the town has developed as a processing point for the regional diamond industry.

Culture and tourism
Lensk has a history museum and operates a branch of the Irkutsk Polytechnic Institute.

Climate
Lensk has a subarctic climate (Köppen climate classification Dfc). Precipitation is moderate and is significantly higher in summer than at other times of the year.

References

Notes

Sources
Official website of the Sakha Republic. Registry of the Administrative-Territorial Divisions of the Sakha Republic. Lensky District.

External links
 Unofficial website of Lensk
 Website of the Secondary School #1 in Lensk

Cities and towns in the Sakha Republic
Populated places established in 1663
1663 establishments in Russia
Populated places on the Lena River